Autódromo Parque de la Velocidad de San Jorge is a  motorsports circuit located near San Jorge, Argentina. The circuit was developed for national competitions. Around the circuit extends a very natural landscape, composed of important trees that give a beautiful aspect to the path, being considered as one of the best circuits in the country.

Lap records 

The official race lap records at the Autódromo Parque de la Velocidad de San Jorge are listed as:

References

Motorsport venues in Santa Fe Province